Swing the Western Way is a 1947 American Western film directed by Derwin Abrahams and written by Barry Shipman. The film stars Jack Leonard, Mary Dugan, Thurston Hall, Regina Wallace, Tris Coffin and Sam Flint. The film was released on June 26, 1947, by Columbia Pictures.

Plot

Cast          
Jack Leonard as Bob Randal
Mary Dugan as Jean Darrow
Thurston Hall as Jasper Jim Bandy
Regina Wallace as Cornelia Kathridge
Tris Coffin as Martin
Sam Flint as Senator Darrow
Ralph Littlefield as Postman
George Lloyd as Sheriff Morgan
Eddie Acuff as Mr. Spraggs
Johnny Bond as Johnny
Hoosier Hot Shots as Speciality Act

References

External links
 

1947 films
American Western (genre) films
1947 Western (genre) films
Columbia Pictures films
Films directed by Derwin Abrahams
American black-and-white films
1940s English-language films
1940s American films